{{Infobox officeholder
| honorific_prefix    = Maulvi
| name                = Hizbullah Afghan| native_name         = 
| image               = 
| caption             = 
| alt                 = 
| order               = 
| office              = Chief of Staff of the Al-Badr Corps
| term_start          = 4 October 2021
| term_end            = 4 March 2022
| predecessor         = 
| successor           = Mullah Bari Gul Akhund
| office1             = Governor of Farah
| term_start1         = August 2021
| term_end1           = 6 November 2021
| predecessor1        = 
| successor1          = Noor Mohammad Rohani
| president1          = Hibatullah Akhundzada 
| primeminister1      = Hassan Akhund
| birth_date          = 
| birth_place         = 
| birthname           = 
| nationality         = Afghan
| party               = 
| otherparty          = 
| spouse              = 
| children            = 
| residence           = 
| alma_mater          = 
| occupation          = 
| profession          =  politician, military officer 
| cabinet             = 
| committees          = 
| portfolio           = 
| footnotes           = 
| allegiance          = 
| branch              =  Islamic Emirate Army
| rank                = Chief of Staff
| commands            = Chief of Staff of the Al-Badr Corps
| battles             =
}}Maulvi Hizbullah Afghan''' is an Afghan Taliban politician and military officer served as Chief of Staff of the Al-Badr Corps since 4 October 2021 to 4 March 2022. He has also served as Governor of Farah from  August 2021 to 6 November 2021.

References

Year of birth missing (living people)
Living people
Taliban commanders
Afghan military personnel
Governors of Farah Province